The 2014 Eisenhower Trophy took place 10–13 September on the Iriyama and Oshitate courses at Karuizawa 72 Golf East in Karuizawa, Japan. It was the 29th World Amateur Team Championship for the Eisenhower Trophy and the second to be held in Japan. The tournament was a 72-hole stroke play team event with 67 three-man teams. The best two scores for each round counted towards the team total. Each team played two rounds on the two courses. The leading teams played on the Oshitate course on the third day and on the Iriyama course on the final day.

United States won their 15th Eisenhower Trophy, two strokes ahead of Canada, who took the silver medal. Spain took the bronze medal one stroke ahead of Sweden at fourth. The top eight teams finished within six strokes.

Jon Rahm had the best 72-hole aggregate of 263.

The 2014 Espirito Santo Trophy was played on the same courses one week prior.

Teams
67 teams contested the event. Each team had three players with the exception of Ghana who were represented by only two players.

The following table lists the players on the leading teams.

Results

Source:

Individual leaders
There was no official recognition for the lowest individual scores.

Source:

References

External links
Coverage on International Golf Federation website

Eisenhower Trophy
Golf tournaments in Japan
Eisenhower Trophy
Eisenhower Trophy
Eisenhower Trophy